Dust to Glory is a 2005 documentary film about the Baja 1000 off-road race. Filming occurred throughout the 2003 event. The film is directed by Dana Brown of Step Into Liquid fame. The film was edited in Adobe Premiere Pro. The film score was by Nathan Furst.

Cast
Mario Andretti, Sal Fish, Chad McQueen, Jimmy Vasser, Roberto Guerrero, Michel Jourdain Jr., Robby Gordon, Ricky Johnson, Malcolm Smith, Johnny Campbell, Steve Hengeveld, J.N. Roberts, Corky McMillin, Andy McMillin, Scott McMillin, Mark McMillin, Mike McCoy, Eric Solorzano, Larry Roeseler.

Reviews
 "All in all, this is an entertaining and informative film that exposes an event unlike any other. Some scenes are strictly for race lovers, but there is enough here overall to entertain curious outsiders." -Jeff Otto, IGN Filmforce

See also
 Off-road racing
 SCORE International

References

External links
 

2005 films
Documentary films about auto racing
Sport in Baja California
Off-road racing
Films directed by Dana Brown
American auto racing films
2000s English-language films
2000s American films